The 2002–03 Greek Basket League season was the 63rd season of the Greek Basket League, the highest tier professional basketball league in Greece. It was also the 11th season of the Greek Basket League championship that was regulated by HEBA (ESAKE). The winner of the league was Panathinaikos, which beat AEK Athens in the league's payoff's finals. The clubs Near East and Olympia Larissa were relegated to the Greek A2 League. The top scorer of the league was Georgios Diamantopoulos, a player of Panionios. Fragiskos Alvertis, a player of Panathinaikos, was voted the MVP of the league.

Teams

Regular season

Source:  esake.gr, galanissportsdata.com

Playoffs

The finals

Final standings

Top Players

References

External links
 Official HEBA Site
 Official Hellenic Basketball Federation Site
  HEBA Site, season 2002/03
  Galanis Sports Data 

Greek Basket League seasons
1
Greek